Bouaye ( or) is a commune in the Loire-Atlantique department in western France.

Population

Transport
Bouaye station is served by train services between Pornic, Saint-Gilles-Croix-de-Vie and Nantes.

See also
Communes of the Loire-Atlantique department

References

External links
Official site

Communes of Loire-Atlantique